Clarence E. Coyne (December 23, 1881 – May 27, 1929) was an American politician. Between January and May 1929 he served as Lieutenant Governor of South Dakota.

Life
Clarence Coyne was born in Rock Island, Illinois. He attended the public schools, graduated from high school and completed a course in a business college. For four years he served in the Naval Militia of Illinois. Since 1905 he resided in South Dakota and was engaged in the newspaper business in Fort Pierre. Politically he joined the Republican Party. Between 1911 and 1914 he was the sheriff of Stanley County, and from 1922 through 1927 he served as Secretary of State of South Dakota.

In 1928 Clarence Coyne was elected to the office of the lieutenant governor of his state. He served in this position between January 1929 and his death on May 27 of the same year. In this function he was the deputy of Governor William J. Bulow, and he presided over the South Dakota Senate.

References

1881 births
1929 deaths
Lieutenant Governors of South Dakota
South Dakota Republicans
Politicians from Rock Island, Illinois
People from Fort Pierre, South Dakota
Military personnel from Illinois